Steven R. Mascaro (born January 15, 1946) was a member of the Utah House of Representatives from 2002–2010, representing District 47 from West Jordan, Utah.

Biography 

Mascaro is a member of the Church of Jesus Christ of Latter-day Saints (LDS Church). He graduated from California State University, Fullerton in 1971 with a bachelor's degree in marketing management.

Mascaro is the president and a business partner of Infill Group Incorporated. In the local community, he has also been involved with directing in various organizations, including the Utah Association of Realtors and the Sandy Chamber of Commerce.

Politics 

When State Representative Bryan D. Holladay was elected Mayor of West Jordan in 2001, he recommended Mascaro as his replacement. Receiving the nomination from Republican Party of Utah, Mascaro ran unopposed and took office representing district 47 of the Utah House of Representatives on January 8, 2002. Facing contenders in future campaigns, he was reelected in 2004, 2006, and 2008. In 2010 he ran against Republican Ken Ivory for the Republican Party nomination, and was defeated at the county convention 77%–23%. Following his failed attempt at re-nomination he endorsed Democratic candidate John Rendell for his former seat.

In 2008 Mascaro was one of five state representatives filing a bipartisan ethics complaint against a fellow Republican for allegedly bribing his opponent during a primary election. Shortly later, an unrelated report by a female intern about Mascaro was leaked, with the suggestion of improper conduct. Speaking to the media Mascaro dismissed the report, arguing the story was retaliation by House party leadership, who had already labeled Mascaro a "dissident Republican."

Electoral results

Notes

External links 
 Mascaro's profile by the Utah House of Representatives
 Mascaro's candidate information from Project Vote Smart
 Candidate information and statements from the Deseret News

1946 births
Latter Day Saints from Utah
California State University, Fullerton alumni
Living people
Republican Party members of the Utah House of Representatives
People from West Jordan, Utah
21st-century American politicians
Latter Day Saints from California